CenturyTel of Arkansas, Inc. is a telephone operating company of CenturyLink providing local telephone services to Arkansas, including Ash Flat, Horseshoe Bend, and Mount Pleasant. The company was founded in 1956.

The company is owned by CenturyLink, which used to be CenturyTel.

See also
CenturyLink

References

Lumen Technologies
Communications in Arkansas
Telecommunications companies of the United States
Telecommunications companies established in 1956
American companies established in 1956